Following is a list of municipal presidents of Tlaquepaque, in the Mexican state of Jalisco:

References

Tlaquepaque
Tlaquepaque